Lule Sámi is a Uralic, Sámi language spoken around the Lule River, Sweden, and in the northern parts of Nordland county in Norway, especially the Hamarøy (formerly Tysfjord) municipality, where Lule Sámi is an official language. It is written in the Latin script, having an official alphabet.

Status
With 650 speakers, it is the second largest of all Sámi languages. It is reported that the number of native speakers is in sharp decline among the younger generations. The language has, however, been standardised in 1983 and elaborately cultivated ever since.

Phonology

Consonants

However, these can be treated as clusters for the purpose of phonology, since they are clearly composed of two segments and only the first of these lengthens in quantity 3. The terms "preaspirated" and "pre-stopped" will be used in this article to describe these combinations for convenience.

 Stops before a homorganic nasal (pre-stopped nasals) are realised as unreleased stops.
  is realised as a labiodental fricative  in the syllable onset (before a vowel), and as bilabial  in the syllable coda (in a consonant cluster).

Vowels
Lule Sámi possesses the following vowels:

  can be realised as a true diphthong, or a long monophthong .
 Long  and the diphthongs  and  occur only in stressed syllables.
They also only occur in stressed syllables.
 Short  and long  can occur in unstressed syllables, but only when a preceding stressed syllable contains .

Consonant length and gradation

Consonants, including clusters, that occur after a stressed syllable can occur in multiple distinctive length types, or quantities. These are conventionally labelled quantity 1, 2 and 3 or Q1, Q2 and Q3 for short. The consonants of a word alternate in a process known as consonant gradation, where consonants appear in different quantities depending on the specific grammatical form. Normally, one of the possibilities is named the strong grade, while the other is named weak grade. The consonants of a weak grade are normally quantity 1 or 2, while the consonants of a strong grade are normally quantity 2 or 3.

 Quantity 1 includes any single consonant. It originates from Proto-Samic single consonants in the weak grade.
 Quantity 2 includes any combination of consonants (including two of the same) with a short consonant in the coda of the preceding syllable. It originates from Proto-Samic single consonants in the strong grade, as well as combinations of two consonants in the weak grade.
 Quantity 3 includes any combination of consonants (including two of the same) with a long consonant in the coda of the preceding syllable. It originates from Proto-Samic combinations of two consonants in the strong grade.

Throughout this article and related articles, consonants that are part of different syllables are written with two consonant letters in IPA, while the lengthening of consonants in quantity 3 is indicated with an IPA length mark.

Not all consonants can occur in every quantity type. The following limitations exist:
 Single  is restricted to quantity 1, and does not alternate.
  occurs in quantity 2 and 3, but not in quantity 1.

When a consonant can occur in all three quantities, quantity 3 is termed "overlong".

Phonological processes

Umlaut

Umlaut is a process whereby a diphthong in a stressed syllable changes depending on the vowel in the next syllable.

For such words, these two diphthongs can be considered variants of each other, while in words whose stems end with another vowel, these vowels remain distinct. The following table shows the different patterns that occur with different following vowels:

The second type of umlaut, called "diphthong simplification" or "monophthongization", is similar to its Northern Sami counterpart, but works differently. The diphthongs  and  become  and  respectively, if:
 The vowel in the next syllable is short (thus including also ), and
 The following consonant is quantity 1 or 2.
The reverse process also occurs, turning the long vowels back into diphthongs if the consonant becomes quantity 3 or the vowel in the next syllable becomes long.

The third type of umlaut, progressive umlaut, works in the other direction.

Unstressed vowel lengthening

If a stressed syllable contains a short vowel followed by a single (quantity 1) consonant, then a short vowel in the following syllable is lengthened.
  "to do" ~ dagá (1st p. sg. present)
  "to twist" ~ bånjå̄ (1st p. sg. present)

Dialects

Sammallahti divides Lule Sámi dialects as follows:

 Northern dialects: Sörkaitum, Sirkas and Jåkkåkaska in Sweden, Hamarøy in Norway
 Southern dialects: Tuorpon in Sweden
 Forest dialects: Gällivare and Serri in Sweden

Features of the northern dialects of Lule Sámi are:
 Long  is also rounded to  after  in a first syllable.

Features of the southern dialects of Lule Sámi are:
 Umlaut of short  to  before .

Orthography

The orthography used for Lule Sámi is written using an extended form of the Latin script.

Traditionally, the character  has been used to represent . In place of n-acute (available in Unicode and mechanical type writers, but not in Latin-1 or traditional Nordic keyboards), many have used  or even .

Grammar

Cases

Lule Sámi has seven cases:

Nominative

Like the other Uralic languages, the nominative singular is unmarked and indicates the subject of a predicate.
The nominative plural is also unmarked and is always formally the same as the genitive singular.

Genitive

The genitive singular is unmarked and looks the same as the nominative plural. The genitive plural is marked by a-j. The genitive is used:

to indicate possession
with prepositions
with postpositions.

Accusative

The accusative is the direct object case and it is marked with -v in the singular. In the plural, its marker is -t, which is preceded by the plural marker -j.

Inessive

The inessive marker is -n in the singular and the plural, when it is then preceded by the plural marker -j. This case is used to indicate:

where something is
who has possession of something

Illative

The illative marker is -j in the singular and -da in the plural, which is preceded by the plural marker -i, making it look the same as the plural accusative. This case is used to indicate:

where something is going
who is receiving something
the indirect object

Elative

The elative marker is -s in the singular and the plural, when it is then preceded by the plural marker -j. This case is used to indicate:

where something is coming from

Comitative

The comitative marker in the singular is -jn and -j in the plural, which means that it looks like the genitive plural. The comitative is used to state with whom or what something was done.

Pronouns

The personal pronouns have three numbers - singular, plural and dual. The following table contains personal pronouns in the nominative and genitive/accusative cases.

The next table demonstrates the declension of a personal pronoun he/she (no gender distinction) in various cases:

Verbs

Person

Lule Sámi verbs conjugate for three grammatical persons:

first person
second person
third person

Mood

Lule Sámi has five grammatical moods:

indicative
imperative
optative (also known as "Imperative II")
conditional
potential

Grammatical number

Lule Sámi verbs conjugate for three grammatical numbers:

singular
dual
plural

Tense

Lule Sámi verbs have two simple tenses:

past
non-past

and two compound tenses:

Present perfect
Pluperfect

Verbal nouns

Negative verb

Lule Sámi, like Finnish, the other Sámi languages, and some Estonian dialects, has a negative verb. In Lule Sámi, the negative verb conjugates according to tense (past and non-past), mood (indicative, imperative and optative), person (1st, 2nd and 3rd) and number (singular, dual and plural).

References

Literature 
 Grundström, Harald: Lulelappisches Wörterbuch
 Kintel, Anders 1991: Syntaks og ordavledninger i lulesamisk. Kautokeino : Samisk utdanningsråd.
 Spiik, Nils-Erik 1989: Lulesamisk grammatik. Jokkmokk: Sameskolstyrelsen. 
 Wiklund, K.B. 1890: Lule-lappisches Wörterbuch. Helsinki: Suomalais-ugrilaisen seuran toimituksia ; 1

External links

The Children's TV series Binnabánnaš in Lule Sámi
Sámásta Lule Sámi lessons and resources (in Swedish)
Morphological analyzer for Lule Sámi
Language generator for Lule Sámi
Lule Sámi grammar in Norwegian(Currently only covers pronouns).
Ådå Testamennta The New Testament in Lule Sámi (PDF)
 Giehttjit áddjá goaden audiobook in Lule Sámi

 
Sámi in Norway
Sámi in Sweden
Languages of Norway
Languages of Sweden
Western Sámi languages